Deutsche Werft (English: German Shipyard) was a shipbuilding company in Finkenwerder Rüschpark, Hamburg, Germany. It was founded in 1918 by Albert Ballin and with Gutehoffnungshütte (GHH), Allgemeine Elektricitäts-Gesellschaft (AEG) and Hamburg Amerikanische Packetfahrt Actien Gesellschaft (HAPAG) as investors.

In World War II Deutsche Werft built 113 Type IX and XXIII U-boats for the Kriegsmarine. To this end, it operated three camps directly on the company premises (the Deutsche Werft construction site camp, Deutsche Werft Finkenwärder camp and the Rüschkanal Eastern workers' camp), was involved in five camps in the Finkenwerder district and six in the port area, as well as nine camps in the city area. In addition, there were the camps at the Reiherstiegwerft shipyard, which also belonged to Deutsche Werft.

In 1968 Deutsche Werft was merged and became part of Howaldtswerke-Deutsche Werft.

References

External links

Gallery 

Shipbuilding companies of Germany
Vehicle manufacturing companies established in 1918
Defunct companies of Germany
Manufacturing companies based in Hamburg
Vehicle manufacturing companies disestablished in 1968
1968 disestablishments in Germany
German companies established in 1918
Manufacturing companies established in 1918